Raymond T McNally (1931–2002) was an American author and a professor of Russian and East European History at Boston College.  He specialized in the history of horror and wrote many books on the subject. He co-authored several books with Radu Florescu (1925–2014), who was also a professor at Boston College.

Publications
 
 
 
 
 
 
  (Volume 1 of Dracula, Prince of Many Faces)

External links
 

Obituaries
 
 
 

Boston College faculty
1931 births
2002 deaths
Historians of Russia
Dracula